Aubeterre is a commune in the Aube department in the Grand Est region of north-central France.

The inhabitants of the commune are known as Aubeterriens or Aubeterriennes.

Geography
Aubeterre is located some 25 km north by north-east of Troyes and 17 km south by south-west of Arcis-sur-Aube. Access to the commune is by the D677 road from Voué in the north passing through the length of the commune and the village and continuing to Feuges in the south. The commune is entirely flat farmland.

The commune is served by the Procars Champagne Bus No. 7 bus from Troyes (bus station) to Arcis-sur-Aube and Mailly-le-Camp and vice versa.

Neighbouring communes and villages

History
Before being called Aubeterre the name of the commune was Alba-Terra. On 1 January 2011 the communes of Aubeterre and Montsuzain integrated into the Community of communes Seine Melda Coteaux. A Primary Elementary School is located in the heart of the village next to City Hall. A coffee shop the Betty Boop-Diner is located on the D677 in the village. In late August 2013 the coffee shop changed its name and became Le Relais des amis (The Inn of friends).

Administration

List of Successive Mayors

Demography
In 2017 the commune had 357 inhabitants.

Sites and monuments
The Church of the Purification of the Virgin dates from the 12th and 15th centuries. The Corbels of the prophets are unusual with their Speech scrolls.

The Church contains many items which are registered as historical objects:
A Celebrant Chair (18th century)
Ceramic tiling (13th century)
A Statue: Saint John the Baptist (16th century)
Stained glass (16th century)
A Statuette: Saint Marguerite (disappeared) (16th century)
A Statue: Virgin and Child (15th century)
A Statue: Saint Bishop (14th century)
A Statue: Virgin in prayer (16th century)
A Bronze Bell (1770)
A Paten (1819)
A Chalice (19th century)
An old door and hinges (16th century)
Some benches with balustrades (1795)
A Monumental painting (15th century)
A Stoup (16th century)
A Baptismal Font (16th century)
A Monumental painting (16th century)

See also
Communes of the Aube department

References

External links
Aubeterre on the old IGN website 
Aubeterre on Géoportail, National Geographic Institute (IGN) website 
Aubeterre on the 1750 Cassini Map

Communes of Aube